This is the timeline of known spaceflights, both crewed and uncrewed, sorted chronologically by launch date. Owing to its large size, the timeline is split into smaller articles, one for each year since 1951. There is a separate list for all flights that occurred before 1951.

The  list and lists for subsequent years contain planned launches, but statistics only include past launches.

The timeline contains all flights which have crossed the edge of space, were intended to do so but failed, or are planned in the near future. Significant test flights of spaceflight systems may be listed even if they were not planned to reach space. Some lists are further divided into orbital launches (sending a payload into orbit, whether successful or not) and suborbital flights (e.g. ballistic missiles, sounding rockets, experimental spacecraft).

Orbital launches by year 

Extracted from launch data.

Deep-space rendezvous after 2029

See also

 Discovery and exploration of the Solar System
 Launch vehicle
 List of crewed spacecraft
 Outer space
 Space exploration
 Space launch market competition
 Timeline of Solar System exploration
 Timeline of space exploration
 Timeline of private spaceflight

References

External links